Elections were held in the organized municipalities in the Thunder Bay District of Ontario on October 25, 2010 in conjunction with municipal elections across the province.

Conmee
Kevin Holland was acclaimed as reeve of Conmee, and Mary-Lynne Hunt, Grant Arnold, Robert Rydholm and Robert McMaster were elected to council.

Dorion
No council elections were held in Dorion, as the entire council won by acclamation. Dave Harris will serve as reeve; Ed Chambers, Don Modin, Diane Poulin and Kitty Dumonski will serve on council.

Gillies
No council elections were held in Gillies, as the entire council won by acclamation. Rick Kieri will serve as reeve; Rudy Buitenhuis, William Groenheide, Henry Jantunen and Linda Turk will serve on council.

Greenstone
Renald Beaulieu won the mayoralty of Greenstone, and Chris Walterson, William Assad, Mary Moylan, Jane Jantunen, Ronald Melhuish, Kevin Melanson, Jay Daiter and Armand Giguère were elected to council.

Manitouwadge
Incumbent mayor John MacEachern was re-elected in Manitouwadge; Sheldon Plummer, Connie Hunter, Donna Jaunzarins and Natalie Labbee were elected to council.

Marathon
No council elections were held in Marathon, as the entire council won by acclamation. Rick Dumas will serve as mayor; Terry Fox, Ray Lake, Roger Souckey and Kelly Tsubouchi will serve on council.

Neebing
Ziggy Polkowski defeated incumbent mayor Steven Harasen in Neebing; Dawne Kilgour, Roger Shott, Bev Dale, Curtis Coulson, Bill Lankinen and Michael McCooeye were elected to council.

Nipigon
Incumbent mayor Richard Harvey was acclaimed back into office in Nipigon; James Foulds, Gordon MacKenzie, Levina Collins and Louise Dupuis were elected to council.

O'Connor
Incumbent mayor Ron Nelson was acclaimed back into office in O'Connor; Kevin Foekens, Gwen Garbutt, Bishop Racicot and Jim Vezina were elected to council.

Oliver Paipoonge
Incumbent mayor Lucia Kloosterhuis won re-election in Oliver Paipoonge. Bernie Kamphof, Allan Vis, Jim Byers and Eric Collingwood were elected to council.

Red Rock
Incumbent mayor Gary Nelson was re-elected in Red Rock. Steven Carruthers, Darquise Robinson, Judith Sobush and Sara Park were elected to council.

Schreiber
Don McArthur was acclaimed mayor of Schreiber. Mark Figliomeni, Bob Krause, Lorraine Huard and Pat Halonen were elected to council.

Shuniah
Incumbent reeve Maria Harding was re-elected in Shuniah. Ron Giardetti, Donna Blunt, Ab Covello and Alana Bishop were elected to council.

Terrace Bay
There were no council elections in Terrace Bay, as incumbent mayor Michael King and councillors George Davis, Gino Leblanc, Jamie Robinson and Rick St. Louis were all acclaimed back into office.

Thunder Bay
Keith Hobbs defeated incumbent mayor Lynn Peterson in Thunder Bay.

Voters are asked to elect a mayor, five at-large city councillors and seven ward councillors. Unofficially, of 80,796 registered voters, 38,327 votes were cast. Voter turnout was 47.43%, a significant increase over the 38.19% turnout of the 2006 election.

Councillors at-large 

Five councillors are elected at-large to sit on City Council. Nineteen people ran for the position in 2010. Each registered voter can choose up to five candidates. Incumbents Larry Hebert, Iain Angus, Rebecca Johnson, and Aldo Ruberto were re-elected, with former mayor Ken Boshcoff replacing Frank Pullia, who ran for mayor. Both Boshcoff and Hebert gained more votes than the mayor.

Ward councillors 

The city of Thunder Bay is divided into seven electoral wards: Current River, McIntyre, McKellar, Neebing, Northwood, Red River, and Westfort. Residents of each ward elect one member to represent their ward on city council. Twenty-five people ran for these positions. All six incumbent ward councillors were re-elected. The incumbent councillor for McKellar did not seek re-election.

Current River

McIntyre

McKellar

Neebing

Northwood

Red River

Westfort

References 

2010 Ontario municipal elections
Thunder Bay District